Ab Qalat (also Romanized as Āb Qalāt and Ābqalāt) is a village in Jaydasht Rural District, in the Central District of Firuzabad County, Fars Province, Iran. At the 2006 census, its population was 105, in 21 families.

References 

Populated places in Firuzabad County